Below is a list of current National Basketball Association (NBA) team rosters. NBA rosters are limited to 15 players during the regular season. Teams may carry up to 20 players during the offseason.

Eastern Conference
There are 15 teams in the Eastern Conference.

Atlantic Division

Boston Celtics

Brooklyn Nets

New York Knicks

Philadelphia 76ers

Toronto Raptors

Central Division

Chicago Bulls

Cleveland Cavaliers

Detroit Pistons

Indiana Pacers

Milwaukee Bucks

Southeast Division

Atlanta Hawks

Charlotte Hornets

Miami Heat

Orlando Magic

Washington Wizards

Western Conference
There are 15 teams in the Western Conference.

Northwest Division

Denver Nuggets

Minnesota Timberwolves

Oklahoma City Thunder

Portland Trail Blazers

Utah Jazz

Pacific Division

Golden State Warriors

Los Angeles Clippers

Los Angeles Lakers

Phoenix Suns

Sacramento Kings

Southwest Division

Dallas Mavericks

Houston Rockets

Memphis Grizzlies

New Orleans Pelicans

San Antonio Spurs

See also
 List of current National Basketball Association head coaches
 List of National Basketball Association general managers
 List of National Basketball Association team presidents

References

External links
Teams at NBA.com

National Basketball Association lists
NBA team rosters